Arteche (IPA: [arˈtɛtʃe]), officially the Municipality of Arteche, is a 3rd class municipality in the province of Eastern Samar, Philippines. According to the 2020 census, it has a population of 16,360 people.

In the southeast, it is bounded by Oras, to the south by San Policarpo. To the north, it is bounded by Pacific Ocean and in the north-west by Lapinig.

History
Arteche was created in 1950 from the barrios of San Ramon, Carapdapan, Beri, Tangbo, Catumsan, Bego, Concepcion, Casidman, Tawagan, and Tibalawon of the Municipality of Oras.

Geography

Barangays
Arteche is politically subdivided into 20 barangays.

Climate

Demographics

Economy

References

External links
 [ Philippine Standard Geographic Code]
 Philippine Census Information
 Local Governance Performance Management System

Municipalities of Eastern Samar